Augustinian Studies is a peer-reviewed academic journal devoted to the study of Augustine of Hippo. Its primary focus is the study of Augustine himself, as viewed from various theological, philosophical, and historical perspectives. Articles concerned more broadly with the study of Augustine, such as studies of other persons, groups, or issues in Augustine's time, may also be included. The journal also publishes the annual Saint Augustine Lecture, given each Fall at Villanova University. A special double issue of Augustinian Studies, containing essays on Augustine's City of God, was published in 1999. The journal's editor-in-chief is Jonathan P. Yates, who replaced Allan D. Fitzgerald in 2012. Augustinian Studies is published by the Philosophy Documentation Center, in cooperation with the Augustinian Institute at Villanova University.

Abstracting and indexing 
Augustinian Studies is abstracted and indexed in Academic Search Premier, L'Année philologique, Arts & Humanities Citation Index, Catholic Periodical and Literature Index, Expanded Academic ASAP, Index Philosophicus, InfoTrac OneFile, International Bibliography of Periodical Literature, International Bibliography of Book Reviews of Scholarly Literature, International Philosophical Bibliography, The Philosopher's Index, PhilPapers, Religious and Theological Abstracts, and Scopus.

See also 
 Augustinus-Lexikon
 Early Christianity
 Patristics
 List of graduate programs in Augustinian Studies

External links 
 
 Augustinian Institute at Villanova University
 The Saint Augustine Lecture Series
 History, Apocalypse, and the Secular Imagination

Publications established in 1970
Biannual journals
English-language journals
Philosophy Documentation Center academic journals
Patristic journals
Augustine of Hippo
Augustine studies